MV Corals is a cruise ship that operates between the city of Cochin and the Lakshadweep islands. The ship was built by Colombo Dockyard in Sri Lanka with Norway-based Global Maritime Brevik. The then Union Minister of Shipping, Road Transport and Highways, Nitin Jairam Gadkari, dedicated the ship on January 10, 2015, to the nation.

Details 
Corals has a capacity to carry 400 passengers and 250 tonnes of cargo. The vessel has 10 first class cabin berths, 40 second-class berths and 350 bunks. All the passenger compartments are centrally air-conditioned. The overall length of the vessel is 99.00 m; breadth mld  – 17.00 m; depth – 9.20 m; and design Draft – 4.20 m. The ship has a top speed of 16 knots and covers the distance between Cochin port and Lakshadweep overnight.

References 

2015 ships
Cruise ships